Wales Airport  is a state-owned public-use airport located one nautical mile (2 km) northwest of the central business district of Wales, a city in the Nome Census Area of the U.S. state of Alaska.

Facilities 
Wales airport has one runway designated 18/36 with a 4,000 x 75 ft (1,219 x 23 m) gravel surface.

Airlines and destinations

Prior to its bankruptcy and cessation of all operations, Ravn Alaska served the airport from multiple locations.

References

External links 
 FAA Alaska airport diagram (GIF)
 

 

Airports in the Nome Census Area, Alaska